Trafford Park railway station is in Stretford, close to the border of Trafford Park in the Trafford Metropolitan Borough of Greater Manchester in the North West of England. The station, and all services calling there, is operated by Northern Trains.

History
The station was opened on 4 January 1904 by the Cheshire Lines Committee. Originally named Trafford Park, it was later renamed Trafford Park and Stretford but reverted to Trafford Park on 6 May 1974.

Facilities

The station building is a disused taxi company office. The platforms are elevated, have shelters on each side and are reached by stepped ramps (no step-free access available). The station is unstaffed.

Services
Services run every two hours off-peak, towards Humphrey Park and Liverpool Lime Street to the west and towards Deansgate and Manchester Oxford Road in the east. Services are more frequent during peak hours but may call at different stations. There is no Sunday service.

Oxford Road can be reached in 7 minutes and Liverpool Lime Street in 56 minutes.

References

External links

Railway stations in Trafford
DfT Category F1 stations
Former Cheshire Lines Committee stations
Railway stations in Great Britain opened in 1904
Northern franchise railway stations
Stretford